The Jingjinji Metropolitan Region or Jing-Jin-Ji (JJJ), is the National Capital Region of the People's Republic of China. It is the biggest urbanized megalopolis region in North China, including an economic region surrounding the municipalities of Beijing and Tianjin, and along the coast of the Bohai Sea. This emerging region is rising as a northern metropolitan region rivaling the Pearl River Delta in the south and the Yangtze River Delta in the east. In 2020, Jingjinji had a total population of 110 million people, comparable to that of the Philippines.

Economy
In 2022, Jingjinji produced GDP of ¥10 trillion  (US$1.5 trillion) or equivalent to Mexico. It occupied an area about twice the size of the South Korea. Jingjinji had traditionally been involved in heavy industries and manufacturing. Tianjin's strengths have always been in aviation, logistics, and shipping. Beijing complements this economic activity with strong petrochemical, education, and R&D industries. The area is becoming a significant growth cluster for automobile, electronics, petrochemical sectors, automotive industry, software and aircraft, thus attracting foreign investments in manufacturing and health services.

The Chinese central government has made it a priority to integrate all the cities in the Bohai Bay rim and foster economic development. This includes building an advanced communications network, better highways, increased education, and scientific resources, as well as tapping natural resources off the Bohai rim. In 2016, the Central Government approved a US$36-billion plan to link the various cities making up this metropolis by rail in order to reduce commute times and to better integrate them. The long-term goal is to create a one-hour commuting region; an additional 24 intercity railways are planned to be built before 2050.

In recent decades, petroleum and natural gas deposits have been discovered in the Jingjinji region's coast of the Bohai sea.

Metropolitan areas

Major cities
Jingjinji includes the Beijing, Tianjin, and Hebei provinces. Major cities in these municipalities and provinces include:

Transportation

Air

Major airports
Beijing Capital International Airport
Beijing Daxing International Airport
Tianjin Binhai International Airport
Shijiazhuang Zhengding International Airport

Regional airports
Chengde Puning Airport 
Qinhuangdao Beidaihe Airport
Tangshan Sannühe Airport
Zhangjiakou Ningyuan Airport

Road
There are many major highways servicing the routes within Jingjinji area. This includes the following expressways:

 Jingjintang Expressway, from Beijing, through Tianjin's urban area, to Binhai / TEDA
 Jinghu Expressway, from Jinjing Gonglu Bridge to Shanghai (together with Jingjintang Expressway, this is the expressway from Beijing to Shanghai)
 Jingshen Expressway, through Baodi District on its way from Beijing to Shenyang
 Jingshi Expressway, from Beijing, to Shijiazhuang
 Baojin Expressway, from Beichen District, Tianjin, to Baoding, Hebei -- known in Tianjin as the Jinbao Expressway
 Jinbin Expressway, from Zhangguizhuang Bridge to Hujiayuan Bridge, both within Tianjin
 Jinji Expressway, from central Tianjin to Jixian County
 G95 Capital Area Loop Expressway

The following six China National Highways pass through Tianjin:

 China National Highway 102, through Ji County, Tianjin on its way from Beijing to Harbin
 China National Highway 103, from Beijing, through Tianjin's urban area, to Binhai
 China National Highway 104, from Beijing, through Tianjin, to Fuzhou
 China National Highway 105, from Beijing, through Tianjin, to Macau
 China National Highway 112, circular highway around Beijing, passes through Tianjin
 China National Highway 205, from Shanhaiguan, Hebei, through Tianjin, to Guangzhou

High-speed rail

Intercity high-speed rail lines
Beijing–Tianjin intercity railway
Tianjin–Baoding intercity railway

Other high-speed rail lines
Beijing–Shanghai high-speed railway
Beijing–Shenyang high-speed railway
Beijing–Shijiazhuang high-speed railway
Tianjin–Qinhuangdao high-speed railway

High-speed rail lines planned or under construction
Beijing–Zhangjiakou intercity railway

Suburban railway
 Beijing Suburban Railway
 Tianjin Suburban Railway (Tianjin–Jizhou railway)

Metro systems
 Beijing Subway
 Shijiazhuang Metro
 Tianjin Metro

Light rail
 Tianjin Tram

See also
 Bohai Economic Rim
 Megalopolises in China
 Pearl River Delta
 Yangtze River Delta
 Keihanshin
 Greater Tokyo Area
 Seoul Capital Area
 Taipei–Keelung metropolitan area

Notes

References

Metropolitan areas of China
Proposed infrastructure in China
Geography of Zhangjiakou